Hello, I'm Your Aunt! is a Soviet 1975 comedy directed by Viktor Titov and is loosely based on the 1892 play Charley's Aunt by Brandon Thomas. Produced by T/O Ekran. The film was an immense hit; many lines of dialogue (for example "I am an old soldier and don't know words of love") subsequently became catch phrases themselves.

Plot summary
The action takes place at the beginning of 20th century.

Unemployed and homeless Babbs Baberley (Alexander Kalyagin) is being chased by the police who attempt to arrest him for vagrancy. Babbs finds himself in a rich house, where he encounters Charlie and Jackie. Babbs' unsuccessful attempt to disguise himself as a woman gives Charlie and Jackie an idea. By threatening to surrender Babbs to the (successfully bribed) police, they force their unexpected visitor to dress once again as a woman and pass himself for Donna Rosa d'Alvadorez, Charlie's millionaire aunt who is expected to arrive with a visit from Brazil. Charlie and Jackie want Babbs to seduce Judge Criggs (Armen Dzhigarkhanyan) with the irresistible charms of a millionaire widow and to trick the Judge into giving his nieces, Annie and Betty, a permission to marry Charlie and Jackie.

Complications to the scheme ensue. First, Jackie's father Colonel Chesney (Mikhail Kozakov) decides to help his shattered finances by marrying the rich widow and joins Judge Criggs in courting the fake Aunt Rosa. Next, the real Donna Rosa arrives with her ward Ela. Upon encountering the impostor, Donna Rosa decides to remain incognita that gives her a great opportunity to observe and understand all the participants of the scheme. Babbs falls in love with Ela and is tortured by impossibility to reveal himself.

In the end, the fake Donna Rosa refuses to marry Colonel Chesney, and acquiesces to the courtings of Judge Criggs. The marriage permission for Annie and Betty is secured, and Babbs reveals himself to the company dressed as a man. Judge Criggs is incensed, but Donna Rosa reveals herself as the real aunt. The Judge and the Colonel rush to court her anew. Everyone exits the stage; Ela, despite being enchanted by the transformed "aunt", reluctantly follows. Babbs tries to follow the crowd only to see the door shut in his face. He starts desperately knocking on the door—only to wake up on a park bench pounded by a constable's club.

Interesting facts: Dzhigarhanyan originally auditioned for the part of Colonel Chesney, whom he played in the theater adaptation. However, the film director Viktor Titov saw Dzhigarkhanyan in the role of Judge Criggs.

Cast
 Alexander Kalyagin as Babbs Babberley
 Tamara Nosova as Donna Rosa d'Alvadorez (note - Donna Lucia in the play)
 Tatyana Vedeneyeva as Ela Delahay
 Valentin Gaft as Brasset the footman
 Mikhail Lyubeznov as Charley Wykeham
 Oleg Shklovsky as Jackie Chesney
 Mikhail Kozakov as Colonel Sir Francis Chesney
 Armen Dzhigarkhanyan as Judge Criggs (Stephen Spettigue in the play)
 Galina Orlova as Bettie
 Tatyana Vasilyeva as Annie
 Viktor Gajnov as policeman
 Vladimir Korovkin
 Nikolai Tagin
 Anton Makarov
 Anatoli Malashkin
 Yuri Prokhorov
 Rogvold Sukhoverko

External links 

1975 films
Soviet films based on plays
1970s Russian-language films
1970s musical comedy films
Soviet musical comedy films
Russian musical comedy films
Cross-dressing in film
LGBT-related musical comedy films
Studio Ekran films
Films set in England
Films shot in Moscow
Films directed by Viktor Titov
1975 comedy films
1975 LGBT-related films